The Ministry of Production was a British government department created in February 1942, initially under the title Ministry of War Production, but the following month "War" was dropped from the title. Its purpose was to fill a gap in the machinery of government between, on the one hand, the Ministry of Supply, the Ministry of Aircraft Production and the Admiralty, which were responsible for supplies to the Armed Forces, and, on the other hand, the Ministry of Labour and National Service, which was responsible for the distribution of labour between civilian occupations, war industries and the Armed Forces. The Ministry became was a critical part of the British administrative machine that contributed to victory over the Axis during the Second World War. Its head was the Minister of Production.

1942 establishments in the United Kingdom
United Kingdom, Production
Defunct departments of the Government of the United Kingdom